"Give My Love to Rose" is a country song by Johnny Cash, which he recorded together with the Tennessee Two at Sun Records under the production of Sam Phillips in 1957. The song was released in August of the same year as the B-side of the single "Home of the Blues" (Sun 279), which reached No. 3 in the Country Jockey charts and No. 5 in the Country & Western Chart. "Give My Love To Rose" reached No. 13 in the Country & Western Chart.

Cash recorded the song several times. For his 2002 version, he received his fourth and final Grammy Award for Best Male Country Vocal Performance.

Background
Cash said a prisoner from San Quentin State Prison asked him to take a message to his wife if he ever went through his hometown. This conversation, according to Cash, was the inspiration for the lyric, which is about a dying convict who is released after ten years of imprisonment. The man is on his way to Louisiana from San Francisco to see his wife and his child one last time before he dies. He collapses along the rails of the railway, where he is found by the narrator. The dying man asks the narrator to take his wife his love and a little money. The man agrees.

Cash recorded the song at Sun Records in his usual manner, playing the rhythm guitar himself, with Luther Perkins and Marshall Grant on the lead guitar and bass respectively. The song was the last one which Sam Phillips supervised as a producer. Producing duties then passed to "Cowboy" Jack Clement. An alternative take, with choruses in the background, was rejected by the label.

Releases
Cash recorded the song several times over the course of his career. It appears on the 1960 album Johnny Cash Sings Hank Williams, even though the song is not one of Williams'. It also appears on the album All Aboard the Blue Train with Johnny Cash, released in 1962.

He also included the song on the following albums:
I Walk the Line (1964)
At Folsom Prison (1968)
American IV: The Man Comes Around (2002)

In April 1999 Bruce Springsteen played a solo acoustic version of the song, for the television show An All Star Tribute to Johnny Cash. Springsteen rated the song as one of his favorite Cash songs.

References

External links

1957 singles
1957 songs
Johnny Cash songs
Songs written by Johnny Cash
Sun Records singles
Song recordings produced by Sam Phillips